The R76 is a provincial route in Free State, South Africa that connects Orkney with Bethlehem via Kroonstad.

Route
The R76 begins at a junction with the R30 road 5 kilometres south of the R30 bridge on the Vaal River, which provides access to the town of Orkney in the North West on the other side.

It begins by going east, then south-east, for 29 kilometres to meet the R59 road in the town of Viljoenskroon. After separating Rammulotsi from Viljoenskroon Central, the R76 continues south-south-east for 60 kilometres, meeting the eastern terminus of the R727 road, to enter the town of Kroonstad.

It passes through Kroonstad's Wespark suburb before reaching a roundabout in the suburb of Kroonheuwel, where it turns southwards. It passes through Kroonstad CBD and crosses the Vals River just after. After passing through the Wilgenhof suburb, it forms an interchange with the R34/N1 Highway and proceeds to leave Kroonstad south-eastwards.

From the N1/R34 interchange, the R76 continues south-east for 44 kilometres to meet the R720 road in the town of Steynsrus. It continues for 36 kilometres eastwards to bypass the town of Lindley to the south and meet the R707 road. It continues south-east for 54 kilometres to end at a junction with the N5 National Route and the R26 road in Bethlehem.

References

External links
 Routes Travel Info

76
Provincial routes in South Africa